Brighton Vitta Malasa is an Anglican bishop in Malawi: since 2008  he has been Bishop of Upper Shire, one of the four  Malawian dioceses within the Church of the Province of Central Africa.

Efforts were made in 2019 to remove Malasa from his position.

References

Anglican bishops of Upper Shire
21st-century Anglican bishops in Malawi